Winchester House is a historic house in Natchez, Mississippi, USA.

History
Winchester House was built for Horace Gridley, a city alderman, from 1836 to 1838. It was acquired by Judge Josiah Winchester in 1854. It stayed in the Winchester family until 1928, when it was sold to the Burns family. Eventually, it was purchased by Paul Brown Harrington in 1973.

Heritage significance
It has been listed on the National Register of Historic Places since January 31, 1979.

References

Houses on the National Register of Historic Places in Mississippi
Federal architecture in Mississippi
Greek Revival houses in Mississippi
Houses completed in 1838
Houses in Natchez, Mississippi
Individually listed contributing properties to historic districts on the National Register in Mississippi
National Register of Historic Places in Natchez, Mississippi